The 2012–13 Barangay Ginebra San Miguel season was the 34th season of the franchise in the Philippine Basketball Association (PBA).

Key dates
August 19: The 2012 PBA Draft took place in Robinson's Midtown Mall, Manila.
January 1: Alfrancis Chua was assigned as head coach; Siot Tanquingcen slides down as lead assistant coach.

Draft picks

Roster

Philippine Cup

Eliminations

Standings

Game log

|- bgcolor="#bbffbb"
| 1
|  September 30
|  GlobalPort
|  110–90
|  Caguioa (18)
|  Mamaril (12)
|  Tenorio (10)
|  Smart Araneta Coliseum
|  1–0
|  Boxscore
|- bgcolor="#bbffbb" 
| 2
|  October 7
|  Rain or Shine
|  98–94
|  Caguioa (22)
|  Caguioa, Maierhofer, Mamaril, Hatfield (8)
|  Caguioa, Hatfield (3)
|  Smart Araneta Coliseum
|  2–0
|  Boxscore
|- bgcolor="#edbebf" 
| 3
|  October 13
|  Meralco
|  88–95
|  Caguioa, Ellis (19)
|  Maierhofer (17)
|  Tenorio (5)
|  Digos
|  2–1
|  Boxscore
|- bgcolor="#edbebf" 
| 4
|  October 19
|  Barako Bull
|  82–92
|  Caguioa (21)
|  Mamaril (8)
|  Tenorio (6)
|  Smart Araneta Coliseum
|  2–2
|  Boxscore
|- bgcolor="#edbebf"
| 5
|  October 21
|  Petron Blaze
|  95–98
|  Caguioa (23)
|  Raymundo (10)
|  Tenorio (7)
|  Mall of Asia Arena
|  2–3
|  Boxscore
|- bgcolor="#edbebf"
| 6
|  October 28
|  Alaska
|  69–87
|  Ababou (14)
|  Maierhofer (8)
|  Maierhofer (4)
|  Smart Araneta Coliseum
|  2–4
|  Boxscore

|- bgcolor="#edbebf"
| 7
|  November 4
|  San Mig Coffee
|  68–78
|  Caguioa (18)
|  Mamaril (8)
|  Tenorio, Mamaril (4)
|  Smart Araneta Coliseum
|  2–5
|  Boxscore
|- bgcolor="#bbffbb" 
| 8
|  November 9
|  GlobalPort
|  81–79
|  Caguioa (19)
|  Mamaril, Wilson, Espiritu (7)
|  Helterbrand (6)
|  Cuneta Astrodome
|  3–5
|  Boxscore
|- bgcolor="#bbffbb" 
| 9
|  November 11
|  Talk 'N Text
|  104–101
|  Caguioa (22)
|  Hatfield (13)
|  Hatfield (4)
|  Mall of Asia Arena
|  4–5
|  Boxscore
|- bgcolor="#bbffbb" 
| 10
|  November 18
|  Alaska
|  96–93
|  Caguioa (24)
|  Mamaril (12)
|  Caguioa, Ellis, Tenorio, Hatfield (4)
|  Smart Araneta Coliseum
|  5–5
|  Boxscore
|- bgcolor="#bbffbb" 
| 11
|  November 25
|  Rain or Shine
|  97–90
|  Tenorio (20)
|  Mamaril (9)
|  Tenorio (10)
|  Smart Araneta Coliseum
|  6–5
|  Boxscore
|- bgcolor="#bbffbb" 
| 12
|  November 30
|  Air21
|  99–76
|  Ellis (18)
|  Hatfield (12)
|  Tenorio (7)
|  Smart Araneta Coliseum
|  7–5
|  Boxscore

|- bgcolor="#edbebf" 
| 13
|  December 2
|  Barako Bull
|  79–83
|  Helterbrand (18)
|  Maierhofer (14)
|  Helterbrand (6)
|  Smart Araneta Coliseum
|  7–6
|  Boxscore
|- bgcolor="#edbebf" 
| 14
|  December 9
|  Talk 'N Text
|  80–87
|  Caguioa (20)
|  Maierhofer, Hatfield (9)
|  Caguioa (6)
|  Smart Araneta Coliseum
|  7–7
|  Boxscore

Playoffs

Bracket

Game log

|- bgcolor="#edbebf" 
| 1
|  December 12
|  Rain or Shine
|  65–82
|  Caguioa (16)
|  Maierhofer (11)
|  Helterbrand (4)
|  Smart Araneta Coliseum
|  0–1
|  Boxscores
|- bgcolor="#bbffbb" 
| 2
|  December 14
|  Rain or Shine
|  79–77
|  Ellis (18)
|  Ellis (10)
|  Caguioa, Tenorio (4)
|  Smart Araneta Coliseum
|  1–1
|  Boxscores
|- bgcolor="#edbebf" 
| 3
|  December 16
|  Rain or Shine
|  89–102
|  Tenorio, Mamaril (20)
|  Maierhofer (12)
|  Helterbrand (6)
|  Smart Araneta Coliseum
|  1–2
|  Boxscore

Commissioner's Cup

Eliminations

Standings

Game log

|- bgcolor="#edbebf" 
| 1
|  February 10
|  Air21
|  70–74
|  Caguioa (26)
|  Hill (18)
|  Helterbrand (4)
|  Smart Araneta Coliseum
|  0–1
|  boxscore
|- bgcolor="#edbebf" 
| 2
|  February 15
|  GlobalPort
|  80–89
|  Hill (22)
|  Hill (19)
|  Tenorio (5)
|  Smart Araneta Coliseum
|  0–2
|  boxscore
|- bgcolor="#edbebf" 
| 3
|  February 17
|  Petron Blaze
|  90–105
|  Caguioa (24)
|  Hill (11)
|  Caguioa (6)
|  Smart Araneta Coliseum
|  0–3
|  boxscore
|- bgcolor="#edbebf" 
| 4
|  February 23
|  Alaska
|  69–84
|  Caguioa (20)
|  Macklin (20)
|  Macklin (4)
|  Tubod, Lanao del Norte
|  0–4
|  boxscore
|- bgcolor="#bbffbb" 
| 5
|  February 27
|  Barako Bull
|  93–72
|  Caguioa (23)
|  Macklin (14)
|  Tenorio (6)
|  Smart Araneta Coliseum
|  1–4
|  boxscore

|- bgcolor="#edbebf" 
| 6
|  March 3
|  Rain or Shine
|  93–96
|  Macklin (27)
|  Macklin (16)
|  Tenorio (10)
|  Smart Araneta Coliseum
|  1–5
|  boxscore
|- bgcolor="#bbffbb" 
| 7
|  March 10
|  San Mig Coffee
|  96–88
|  
|  
|  
|  Smart Araneta Coliseum
|  2–5
|  
|- 
| 8
|  March 17
|  Talk 'N Text
|  
|  
|  
|  
|  Smart Araneta Coliseum
|  
|  
|- 
| 9
|  March 22
|  Meralco
|  
|  
|  
|  
|  Smart Araneta Coliseum
|  
|

Governors' Cup

Eliminations

Standings

Game log

Transactions

Trades

Pre-season

Philippine Cup

Commissioner's Cup

Recruited imports

References

Barangay Ginebra San Miguel seasons
Barangay Ginebra